The Immediate Geographic Region of Patrocínio is one of the 3 immediate geographic regions in the Intermediate Geographic Region of Patos de Minas, one of the 70 immediate geographic regions in the Brazilian state of Minas Gerais and one of the 509 of Brazil, created by the National Institute of Geography and Statistics (IBGE) in 2017.

Municipalities 

It comprises 5 municipalities.

 Coromandel    
 Cruzeiro da Fortaleza     
 Guimarânia     
 Patrocínio     
 Serra do Salitre

References 

Geography of Minas Gerais